In applied mathematics, the reflecting function  of a differential system   connects the past state  of the system with the future state  of the system by the formula  The concept of the reflecting function was introduced by Uladzimir Ivanavich Mironenka.

Definition
For the differential system  with the general solution  in Cauchy form, the Reflecting Function of the system is defined by the formula

Application

For the Reflecting Function  of the system  the basic relation 

 

is holding.

Therefore we have an opportunity sometimes to find Poincaré map of the non-integrable in quadrature systems even in elementary functions.

Literature
 Мироненко В. И. Отражающая функция и периодические решения дифференциальных уравнений. — Минск, Университетское, 1986. — 76 с.
 Мироненко В. И. Отражающая функция и исследование многомерных дифференциальных систем. — Гомель: Мин. образов. РБ, ГГУ им. Ф. Скорины, 2004. — 196 с.

External links
 The Reflecting Function Site
 How to construct equivalent differential systems

Differential equations